Aasuvälja may refer to:
Aasuvälja, Järva County, village in Väätsa Parish, Järva County
Aasuvälja, Lääne-Viru County, village in Rägavere Parish, Lääne-Viru County